Treponema maltophilum is a species of Treponema. It is implicated as a pathogen in chronic periodontitis which can induce bone loss. This motile bacillus is a gram negative, facultative anaerobe and a spirochaete.

References

maltophilum